A continuous glucose monitor (CGM) is a device used for monitoring blood glucose on a continual basis by insulin-requiring people with diabetes, e.g. people with type I, type II diabetes or other types of diabetes (e.g. gestational diabetes). A continuous glucose monitor consists of three parts: a small electrode placed under the skin, a transmitter sending readings at regular intervals (ranging from every 5 to 15 min), and a separate receiver. Currently approved CGMs use an enzymatic technology which reacts with glucose molecules in the interstitial fluid generating an electric current. This electric current (proportional to the glucose concentration) is then relayed from a transmitter attached to the sensor out to a reader which displays the data to the patient.

Traditional fingerprick testing of blood glucose levels measures the level at a single point in time. CGM use allows trends in blood glucose to be displayed over time. Some CGM devices have to be periodically calibrated by users with traditional blood glucose measurements, while some do not require user calibration.

CGM is an increasingly adopted technology which has shown to have benefits for people with diabetes. Some studies have demonstrated reduced time spent in hypoglycemia or a lower glycated hemoglobin, both favorable outcomes.
A Cochrane systematic review found that there is limited and conflicting evidence of the effectiveness of continuous glucose monitoring systems in children, adults or patients with poorly controlled diabetes. However, the use of continuous glucose monitors appears to lower hemoglobin A1c levels, more than just monitoring through capillary blood testing, particularly when used by individuals with poorly controlled diabetes together with an integrated insulin pump. However, there are important limitations: CGM systems are not sufficiently accurate for detecting hypoglycemia, a common side-effect of diabetes treatment. This is especially problematic as some devices offer alarm functions to warn of hypoglycemic episodes and people might rely on those alarms. Still, on the Cochrane systematic review mentioned above, the use of continuous glucose monitors did not increase the risk of hypoglycaemia or ketoacidosis. Some manufacturers warn users of relying only on CGM-measurements and the National Institute for Health and Care Excellence recommends to validate hypoglycaemic values via fingerprick testing of blood glucose level.
Another limitation is that glucose levels are taken from the interstitial fluid rather than the blood. As it takes time for glucose to travel from the bloodstream into the interstitial fluid, there is an inherent lag behind the current blood glucose level and the level measured by the CGM. This lag time varies based on the person and the device, and is generally 5–20 minutes.

Flash glucose monitoring 

The original Freestyle Libre monitor introduced by Abbott Diabetes Care in 2015 was described as doing "flash glucose monitoring," with a disposable 14-day sensor probe under the skin (as with other CGM sensors), but factory-calibrated without requiring calibration against a finger-stick glucose test. The sensor measures the glucose level of interstitial fluids (as a proxy for blood sugar levels) continuously; up to eight hours of these readings, averaged over each 15-minute period, are stored in the sensor unit, unlike most other CGM systems, which use a wireless link (typically Bluetooth) to an external device for each reading. Data stored in the sensor are transmitted on demand to a "reader" held within a centimeter or two of the sensor unit, employing near-field communication (NFC) technology. As only eight hours worth of data can be stored, downloads must not be spaced more than eight hours apart.

Differences in US insurance coverage favoring "flash glucose monitoring" over "continuous glucose monitoring" were an advantage to early adoption of Abbott's less expensive system. In the UK, flash glucose monitors and sensors are available to many patients without charge on the National Health Service (NHS).

The later Freestyle Libre 2 version of Abbott's device uses different, incompatible, sensors. It can be programmed to transmit a  low blood sugar (hypoglycemia) or high sugar warning via Bluetooth to a nearby device. The following Freestyle Libre 3 is smaller, and transmits its readings via Bluetooth, as other meters do; it is not described as flash monitoring.

History

United States
The first CGM system was approved by the FDA in 1999. Continued development has extended the length of time sensors can be worn, options for receiving and reading data, and settings for alerting users of high and low glucose levels.

The first iteration of the Medtronic MiniMed took glucose readings every ten seconds with average readings reported every five minutes. Sensors could be worn for up to 72 hours.

A second system, developed by Dexcom, was approved in 2006. The sensor was approved for use for up to 72 hours, and the receiver needed to be within five feet for transmission of data.

In 2008, the third model was approved, Abbott Laboratories' Freestyle Navigator. Sensors could be worn for up to five days.

In 2012, Dexcom released a new device that allowed for the sensor to be worn for seven days and had a transmission distance of 20 feet. Dexcom later introduced an app allowing data from the sensor to be transmitted to an iPhone. This system was approved for paediatric use in 2015.

In September 2017, the FDA approved the first CGM that does not require calibration with fingerstick measurement, the FreeStyle Libre. The Libre is considered a "flash monitoring" system (FGM), and thus not a true ("real-time") CGM system. This device could be worn for up to ten days, but required 12 hours to start readings. and was followed by an updated device that could be worn for up to 14 days, and needed only one hour to start a new sensor. The FreeStyle Libre 2 was approved in Europe in October 2018, and enabled configuration of alerts when glucose is out of range.

In June 2018, the FDA approved the Eversense CGM system for use in people 18 years of age and older with diabetes. This is the first FDA-approved CGM to include a fully implantable sensor to detect glucose, which can be worn for up to 90 days. The Eversense XL, a 180-day version of the system, was approved in Europe in October 2017.

China
China develops and produces CGM systems. The first CGM system to be approved for the European Union is manufactured by Medtrum Technologies. The sensor's intended use is up to 14 days and measures glucose levels every 2 minutes via a smartphone application. Medtrum was founded in 2008 and is based in Shanghai, China.

At the end of 2017, Medtrum introduced the TouchCare A6 CGM (later A7 or Slim in some countries) which measures glucose levels in the interstitial fluid up to 14 days. The TouchCare system comes with mobile applications, including a remote view application. The TouchCare system has glucose alerts and requires calibration every 24 hours.

At the end of 2021 the Medtrum Nano was announced, a very slim device not requiring calibration, approved for up to 14 days use, with customisable glucose alerts. 

Medtrum makes both CGM and insulin pumps, both controlled by a single smartphone application which enables the user to monitor glucose levels and trigger insulin delivery in a closed-loop system.

United Kingdom 

UK NICE guidelines introduced for the NHS in March 2022 in England and Wales advise that all Type 1 diabetic patients should be offered either flash glucose monitoring or CGM. People with Type 2 diabetes should be offered flash glucose monitoring or CGM if they use insulin twice daily or more, are otherwise advised to finger-prick eight times a day, have recurrent or severe hypoglycaemia, have impaired hypoglycaemia awareness, or cannot monitor their own blood sugar levels but they or a carer could use a scanning device. Details differ in Scotland and Northern Ireland.

Device characteristics 
 Continuous vs flash monitoring: Dexcom and Eversense use continuous monitoring where information on the glucose levels are continuously updated. Continuous monitoring allows to set automatic alarms that are triggered when the glucose level goes out of pre-configured thresholds. In contrast, with flash monitoring such as the Freestyle Libre, the glucose level is read automatically by the sensor; however, data is only transmitted to the user on user request. The glucose information store on the sensor contains all the data since the previous read (up to 8 hours). FreeStyle Libre 2 allows configuration of alarms when glucose reaches a pre-determined level.
 Implantable sensors: Since the electronics and battery require a relatively large package, most CGM sensors are worn over the skin with the actual sensing probe penetrating the skin.  However the Eversense sensor is an actual implant, and receives its power wirelesly from a so-called transmitter worn above the skin. The "transmitter" receives data from the sensor every 5 minutes and forwards that data to a nearby device wirelessly. However unlike the Freestyle Libre, the implanted device is too small to have its own battery and memory, so that no glucose readings are generated during periods in which the transmitter is not being worn. The transmitter must be removed at least once a day for recharging (10 minutes) and replacement of the adhesive.

Closed-loop system 
The CGM is a key element in the development of a "closed-loop" system for the treatment of type I diabetes. A closed-loop system involves blood glucose monitored by CGM and the data sent to an insulin pump for calculated delivery of insulin without user intervention. A number of insulin pumps currently offer an "auto mode" however this is not yet a fully closed loop system. A number of open source implementations exist; including the artificial pancreas system and OpenAPS.

References 

Diabetes-related supplies and medical equipment
Medical devices